Chaetodon melapterus, the Arabian butterflyfish, blackfin butterflyfish, or black-finned melon butterflyfish, is a species of marine ray-finned fish, a butterflyfish belonging to the family Chaetodontidae. It is found in the north western Indian Ocean.

Description
Chaetodon melapterus has an almost totally bright yellow body except for the posterior edge which is black. The dorsal fin, anal fin and caudal fin are also deep black. There are three vertical, black bands on the face, one on the snout around the mouth, one through the eye and one just behind the eye. The dorsal fin contains 13 spines and 19–21 soft rays while the anal fin has 3 spines and 18–19 soft rays.

Distribution
Chaetodon melapterus is found in the north western Indian Ocean where it is found in the Persian Gulf, off the southern coasts Arabian Peninsula from the Gulf of Oman to the Gulf of Aden, and in the southern Red Sea.

Habitat and biology
Chaetodon melapterus is found in shallow coastal reefs where it prefers areas with rich coral growth. They live in pairs but there have been occasional records of aggregations. It is an obligate corallivore, feeding exclusively on the polyps. It is an oviparous species which forms pairs to breed.

Taxonomy
Chaetodon melapterus was first formally described in 1863 by the French zoologist Alphonse Guichenot  with the type locality given as Réunion, although this is likely to be in error as the species has not been recorded from the Mascarenes. This species, together with the blacktail butterflyfish (C. austriacus), melon butterflyfish (C. trifasciatus), and oval butterflyfish (C. lunulatus) make up the subgenus Corallochaetodon. This group is probably quite closely related to the subgenus "Citharoedus" (the name is a junior homonym of a mollusc genus), which contains the scrawled butterflyfish (C. meyeri). These subgenera may be separated into the genus Megaprotodon if the genus Chaetodon is split up.

Utilisation
Chaetodon melapterus is unsuitable for keeping in aquaria because of its specialised diet of coral. It makes an occasional appearance in the trade.

References

melapterus
Fish of the Indian Ocean
Fish described in 1863
Taxa named by Alphonse Guichenot